Daryono (5 March 1994 – 9 November 2020) was an Indonesian professional footballer who played as a goalkeeper.

On 9 November 2020, Daryono died because of the disease dengue fever.

Career statistics

Club

Honours

Club honors
Persija Jakarta
 Liga 1: 2018
 Indonesia President's Cup: 2018

References

1994 births
2020 deaths

Association football goalkeepers
Badak Lampung F.C. players
Liga 1 (Indonesia) players
Liga 2 (Indonesia) players
Persija Jakarta players
People from Semarang
Sportspeople from Central Java
Indonesian footballers
Infectious disease deaths in Indonesia
Deaths from dengue fever